The Daniel Young House is a historic house at 34 Main Street in Lubec, Maine.  Built in 1822 for a local businessman, it is a regionally rare example of Federal period double house, and one of the only ones known in the state that is built of wood.  It was listed on the National Register of Historic Places in 1984.

Description and history
The Daniel Young House is located in Lubec's main village, on the south side of Main Street just east of the Congregational Church.  It is a two-story wood-frame structure, with a hip roof and clapboard siding.  Its street-facing front facade is six bays wide, arranged symmetrically with a pair of doorways flanked by sash windows.  The doorways are set under a shared cornice, with pilasters at the outside and between them, and each topped by a half-round transom.  The panel doors, with windows in the upper half, are a c. 1900 alteration, as are the corbelled brick chimneys and the two-over-one sash windows.  A single-story ell extends to the rear.

The house was built in 1822 for Daniel Young, a local businessman who occupied the right unit.  The house has been a two-family for most of its history, although it spent some time in the 20th century divided into four units.  It is the only known example of this form in eastern Maine, and is comparable in the state with brick examples in Portland.

See also
National Register of Historic Places listings in Washington County, Maine

References

Houses on the National Register of Historic Places in Maine
Federal architecture in Maine
Houses completed in 1822
Houses in Washington County, Maine
Lubec, Maine
National Register of Historic Places in Washington County, Maine
1822 establishments in Maine